Tommy Harrell is the current manager of the London senior hurling team.

See also
Gaelic games
List of hurling managers

References

Year of birth missing (living people)
Living people
Hurling managers
Sportspeople from London
Place of birth missing (living people)